Colonel General Ihor Petrovich Smeshko (born 17 August 1955) served as the head of the Security Service of Ukraine (SBU) from 2003 to 2005, where he supported the opposition during the Orange Revolution. In 2010, he entered politics with the Strength and Honor party, which he formed with several former security and intelligence officials. He was chairman of the Intelligence Committee under the President of Ukraine (from October 7, 2014, to March 12, 2015).

Smeshko was registered as a candidate in the 2019 Ukrainian presidential election. In the election he took 6th place with 6.04% of the vote.

Biography 
Born in 1955 in Khrystynivka, Cherkasy Region, Smeshko has made a career as a professional soldier-scholar. He holds a doctorate in Military Cybernetics and served as professor of information systems and systems analysis, publishing over 100 papers. In 1992, he became secretary of the Science Advisory Council of the Ukrainian Ministry of Defense. That same year he was reassigned as Defense Attache to the Ukrainian Embassy in Washington D.C. where he spent 4 years. While there he negotiated a memorandum of military cooperation with the United States during that time. In 1995, Smeshko was awarded a general's star and recalled to Ukraine to lead the president's committee on intelligence, which he did for 3 years. In 1997, Smeshko was appointed Chief Directorate of Intelligence of the Ministry of Defence of Ukraine where he uncovered "massive fraud" in weapons end-user certificate production indicative of arms trafficking at the SBU, then headed by Leonid Derkach. Smeshko implemented stricter controls, particularly for the Kolchuga air defense system.  

In 2000, facing political attacks organized by the SBU, Smeshko resigned from his post as head of the Military Intelligence Directorate and assumed the post of Defense Attache to Switzerland, a demotion. In this position, he negotiated a memorandum of military cooperation with Switzerland. In 2002, Smeshko completed a master's degree in Military Administration and a Law Degree from Shevchenko University in Kyiv. In late 2002, Leonid Kuchma asked Smeshko to return to Ukraine to assist him in handling accusations made by the U.S. State Department that Ukraine had sold the Kolchuga system to Iraq. Later that year, Derkach was fired and Smeshko was appointed head of the SBU. He immediately set into action with a plan to preserve documents, replace top management and reorganize the agency with new pay scales and a mission focused away from KGB style secret political police.

Smeshko was instrumental in the prevention of military action against the civil protests in late 2004. He demanded General Popkov stop his efforts to crack down on the protesters, as the General was mustering 10,000 troops to do so. The SBU and the military intelligence directorate worked to block the fraudulent ascension of Viktor Yanukovich, supporting Viktor Yushchenko. In 2005, Yushchenko fired Smeshko from the SBU.

In 2014 President Petro Poroshenko appointed Smeshko as his adviser. Subsequently, he led the Intelligence Committee under the President. 

Smeshko was a candidate in the 2019 Ukrainian presidential election. In the election he took 6th place with 6.04% of the vote.

Smeshko was number one on the party list of the political party Strength and Honor in the July 2019 Ukrainian parliamentary election. But in the election the party won 3.82%, not enough to clear the 5% election threshold and thus no parliamentary seats. The party also failed to win a constituency seat.

Smeshko was a candidate for Mayor of Kyiv for the party Strength and Honor in the 2020 Kyiv local election. He finished 7th place with 22.418 votes.

Smeshko speaks fluent Russian, English, German and French.

Controversies

Yushchenko poisoning
A parliamentary commission investigating in October 2004 confirmed that Smeshko dined with Viktor Yushchenko on the night of September 5, 2004, where he may have been poisoned. Yushchenko claims to have fallen ill about 3 hours after the dinner and sought medical treatment the following day. Smeshko denies the allegations, citing the existence of several other theories regarding the poisoning, and claims that the allegations were made by Kuchma supporters from within the security services, including former SBU chief Derkach.

Awards and honorary titles 

 Medal "For Military Service of Ukraine" (November 23, 1998)
 State Prize of Ukraine in the field of science and technology (2004)
 Honorary Master of the Joint Intelligence Institute at the National Defense Academy of Ukraine

References

External links
Official website

See also

Ukrainian military personnel
Ukrainian spies
1955 births
Living people
People from Khrystynivka
University of Kyiv, Law faculty alumni
Ukrainian jurists
Directors of the Security Service of Ukraine
People of the Chief Directorate of Intelligence (Ukraine)
National Security and Defense Council of Ukraine
Ukrainian diplomats
Ukrainian inventors
Colonel Generals of Ukraine
Candidates in the 2019 Ukrainian presidential election
Laureates of the State Prize of Ukraine in Science and Technology